"Eet" is a song from Regina Spektor's fifth studio album, Far. It was released as the album's second official single in October 2009. In Europe it was released as a digital download on November 27, 2009.

Music video
A viral music video directed by Adria Petty was released, prior to the album's release, on May 29, 2009. Filming of the music video took place in east Lancaster, California down the street from Club Ed, a film studio located in the Antelope Valley that has been used for various TV shows, motion pictures, and TV commercials for several decades.

Promotion
Spektor performed this song along with "The Calculation" on Saturday Night Live on October 10, 2009.

Track listing
Digital download
"Eet" – 3:51
"The Sword & the Pen" (acoustic version) – 3:37

Charts

References

External links
 "Regina Spektor: When Every Sound Sings", by Ariane Grande, NPR Music, July 22, 2009, with audio of "Eet" as Song of the Day

2009 singles
Regina Spektor songs
Sire Records singles
2009 songs
Song recordings produced by Mike Elizondo
Songs written by Regina Spektor